Miroslav Makaveev (born 16 July 1973) is a Bulgarian wrestler. He competed in the men's freestyle 100 kg at the 1992 Summer Olympics.

References

External links
 

1973 births
Living people
Bulgarian male sport wrestlers
Olympic wrestlers of Bulgaria
Wrestlers at the 1992 Summer Olympics
Place of birth missing (living people)